The 1939 Tour de Serbie was the 1st edition of the Tour de Serbie cycling stage race. It was scheduled from 22 to 29 May.

The winner of overall classification was August Prosenik.

Schedule

Final standings

General classification

References

Vreme digital archive (22.-31. May)
Politika digital archive (22.-31. May)
Pravda digital archive (22.-31. May)
Slovenski dom digital archive (30. May)

External links

Tour de Serbie 1939
Tour de Serbie 1939
Tour de Serbie